Christopher Lannert (born 8 June 1998) is a German professional footballer who plays as a defender for TSV 1860 Munich.

Career
After playing youth football for 1860 Munich, Bayern Munich and Augsburg and senior football for Augsburg II, In October 2020, Lannert signed a two-year contract SC Verl on a free transfer, with Lannert having been released by Augsburg II at the end of the previous season.

References

1998 births
Living people
German footballers
Association football defenders
TSV 1860 Munich players
FC Bayern Munich footballers
FC Augsburg players
FC Augsburg II players
SC Verl players
3. Liga players
Regionalliga players